Erdinç Yavuz (born 4 October 1978) is a former Turkish footballer who played as a central defender.

Club career
Yavuz  played for Kayserispor, Trabzonspor and Sakaryaspor in the Turkish Super Lig. He was recognized for his ability to score headers from corners. He has been called up for the Turkey national football team, but has not made an appearance for the senior side.

Honours

Club
Trabzonspor
Turkish Cup: 2002–03, 2003–04

References

1978 births
Living people
Turkish footballers
Association football defenders
Turkey B international footballers
Kayserispor footballers
Hatayspor footballers
Trabzonspor footballers
Sakaryaspor footballers
Konyaspor footballers
Elazığspor footballers
Süper Lig players
TFF First League players
People from Kayseri